No Code of Conduct is a 1998 action crime thriller film directed by Bret Michaels and released through Sheen Michaels Entertainment a production company created by actor Charlie Sheen and Bret Michaels. The film stars Charlie Sheen, and Martin Sheen as father-and-son vice unit detectives, along with Mark Dacascos who portrays Charlie Sheen's partner. The film was released as a direct-to-video feature in some countries, including: Australia, Sweden, Japan, the Czech Republic, Argentina, Brazil, Azerbaijan, Russia and Turkey. Bret Michaels is credited as Director, Screenwriter, Composer (Music Score), Actor and Executive Producer. Charlie Sheen's credits in this release include Actor, Screenwriter and Executive Producer.

Plot
Jake Peterson (Charlie Sheen) is a dedicated vice unit detective, whose strong-will and dedication to duty begins to take a toll on his marriage to wife Rebecca (Meredith Salenger). Jake's father, Bill Peterson (Martin Sheen) is a veteran detective in the same unit as Jake. As well as the strain of a troubled marriage, Jake is also under pressure to live up to his father's reputation. After the death of a fellow detective, both Jake and his father make it their personal mission to bring the killer or killers to justice. In doing so, they uncover a drug ring smuggling drugs from Mexico into Phoenix, Arizona and quickly discover just how vast and dangerous the smuggling operation really is.

Cast 
 Charlie Sheen as Jake Peterson
 Martin Sheen as Bill Peterson
 Mark Dacascos as Paul DeLucca
 Joe Estevez as Pappy
 Bret Michaels as Frank "Shane" Fields
 Tina Nguyen as Shi
 Paul Gleason as John Bagwell
 Ron Masak as Julian Disanto
 Joe Lando as Willdog
 Courtney Gains as Cameron
 Meredith Salenger as Rebecca Peterson
 Bruce Nelson as Steve

References

External links
 
 

1998 films
1998 action thriller films
1998 crime drama films
1998 drama films
American action thriller films
American crime drama films
American gangster films
American police detective films
Films about father–son relationships
Films produced by Elie Samaha
Films set in Arizona
1990s English-language films
1990s American films